Ångfartygs AB Strömma Kanal, better known as the Strömma Kanalbolaget, is an operator of tourist shipping services in and around Stockholm, Sweden, as well as a number of ferry routes under the name Cinderellabåtarna in the same area. It is part of the  group, which operates tourist services in a number of cities around Europe, including the City Sightseeing tourist bus franchise for Stockholm.

History
Ångfartygs AB Strömma Kanal was started in 1968 with the aim of saving historic ships from being scrapped. It took its name from a 19th-century shipping company that operated services from Stockholm to Sandhamn, via the Strömma Canal. In 1992, the company was taken over by August Lindholm Eftr. AB, a company that operated sightseeing boats within Stockholm, and all the latter company's boats and services were transferred to the Strömma Kanalbolaget. At the same time, the owning company changed its name to Strömma Turism & Sjöfart. In 1993, the company also acquired the vessels and services of City Jet Line AB, who operated fast ferries to the outer archipelago under the brand Cinderella.

Current fleet
Strömma Kanalbolaget's fleet includes a number of notable and historic vessels, including:

 Enköping (1868)
  (1893)
  (1901)
  (1903)
 Östanå I (1906)
 Angantyr (1909)
 Drottningholm (1909)
 Gustafsberg VII (1912)
 Gustaf III (1912)
  (1931)
 Stegeholm (1950)
  (1975)
 Evert Taube (1976)
  (1984)
 Cinderella II (1986)
 Cinderella I (1990)

References

External links

 
 

Transport in Stockholm County
Transport in Stockholm
Stockholm archipelago